Java is a French rap group, formed in 2000 as a cooperation between Erwan Séguillon (R.wan) and François-Xavier Bossard (Fixi). Other members include Jérôme Boivin and Alexis Bossard. The band is famous for its lyrics that contain a lot of puns, and for its musette musical style, using accordions.  In 2008, the collective expanded with the inclusion of producer and multi-instrumentalist K-Mille.

Career
In its formative year, the band released Hawaï, its debut album with the single "Pépettes" with immediate success and a live album Java Sur Seine the following year. They recorded their album Safari Croisière in Brazil in 2003, that included the single "Samba do Jerusalem". After a cool-off period where various members made solo recording, they came together for a third album released on 27 April 2009, right after a tour in a long tour that included Australia. On 7 September 2010, the band announced that they were going on a hiatus for an undetermined period.

Members
Erwan Séguillon alias R.wan – vocals, singer-songwriter
François-Xavier Bossard alias Fixi – accordion/keyboard
Jérôme Boivin alias Pépouseman – double bass
Alexis Bossard alias Bistrol Banto – drums

Solo careers
In addition to their joint work in Java, members François-Xavier Bossard (also known as Fixi) and Erwan Seguillon have developed their own solo careers

Erwan Séguillon

Erwan Séguillon also known as R.wan (or R.Wan or R.WAN) (born in Paris in 1974) has been active since 2006 in releasing his own solo albums: Radio Cortex in 2006, Radio Cortex 2 in 2008 and Peau Rouge in 2012. He is the son of journalist Pierre-Luc Séguillon.

Erwan also worked with a group of songwriters known as "Saint-Ouen All Stars" (that included Gilles Lavanant, Nicolas Kassilchik and Michel Ange Mérinot in addition to R.wan). A dramatic fire accident damaged the recording studio and sound engineer and producer Lucas Chauvière was injured in his hand, but could finish the album with one hand.

François-Xavier Bossard / Fixi
François-Xavier Bossard a multi-instrumentalist also known as Fixi has worked with a number of artists. He cooperated with Jamaican artist Winston McAnuff producing McAnuff's opus Paris Rockin' .

With Winston McAnuff, he has jointly released the Garden of Love EP (4 tracks) followed by the album A New Day both in 2013.

Discography

Discography by members (solo)
Fixi (François-Xavier Bossard)

R.wan (Erwan Séguillon)

References

External links
 Java, official widget
 [ Java] at Allmusic
 Tablature of "Le Poil" song from album Hawaï

French rock music groups
French hip hop groups
Musical groups from Paris